Khazineh Anbar-e Jadid (also Romanized as Khazīneh Anbār-e Jadīd) is a village in Marhemetabad-e Shomali Rural District, Marhemetabad District, Miandoab County, West Azerbaijan Province, Iran. At the 2006 census, its population was 915, in 226 families.

References 

Populated places in Miandoab County